"See You" is the fourth UK single by Depeche Mode, and the first Depeche Mode single written by Martin Gore. The single was released on 29 January 1982 and was later included on the band's second album A Broken Frame.

Background
The single launched a small world tour, with extra band member Alan Wilder, although he did not contribute to the song or the album. There are three versions of "See You" – the 7-inch single version (3:55), the album version (4:34), and an extended 12-inch version with a longer intro (4:50). The "Extended Version" and the "Album Version" are almost the same. The "Album Version" fades out about 20 second before the 12-inch remix does.

The B-side to "See You" is "Now, This Is Fun". The extended version has a longer bridge in the middle and an extended ending, with Dave Gahan sometimes shouting "This is funny!" instead of "This is real fun!" Before release, "Now, This Is Fun" was called "Reason For Fun".

The video for "See You" was directed by Julien Temple. It was also the first video with Alan Wilder. He can be seen briefly playing a mini electronic keyboard and he also appears in several photo booth strips. The first part of the video was filmed at Hounslow railway station in London. At the beginning of the video there is a speakerphone, much like the one on the cover of Music for the Masses, released five years later. The band did not like the video, and it did not show up on the 1985 video compilation Some Great Videos, which included the band's videos up to 1985 except the "A Broken Frame" singles and "Get the Balance Right".

Formats and track listings
These are the formats and track listings of major single releases of "See You":

7-inch: Mute / 7Mute18 (UK)
 "See You" (Single Version) – 3:55
 "Now, This Is Fun" – 3:23

12-inch: Mute / 12Mute18 (UK)
 "See You" (Extended Version) – 4:50
 "Now, This Is Fun" (Extended Version) – 4:45

CD: Mute / CDMute18 (UK)1
 "See You (Extended Version)" – 4:50
 "Now, This Is Fun" – 3:23
 "Now, This Is Fun" (Extended Version) – 4:45

12-inch: Sire / Sire 29957-0 (US)
 "See You" (Extended Version) – 4:50
 "Now, This Is Fun" (Extended Version) – 4:45
 "The Meaning of Love" (Fairly Odd Mix) – 4:59
 "See You" (Single Version) – 3:55

CD: Sire / 40292-2 (US)1
 "See You (Extended Version)" – 4:50
 "Now, This Is Fun" – 3:23
 "Now, This Is Fun" (Extended Version) – 4:45

Notes
1:CD released in 1991
 All songs written by Martin Gore.
 The alternate version names are not listed on the sleeve.

Charts

References

External links
 Single information from the official Depeche Mode website
 Allmusic review 

1980s ballads
1982 singles
Depeche Mode songs
Songs written by Martin Gore
Song recordings produced by Daniel Miller
Mute Records singles
Music videos directed by Julien Temple
1981 songs
UK Independent Singles Chart number-one singles